Worthmann & Steinbach was a Chicago-based architectural firm that was active from 1903 through 1928. It was a partnership between
Henry W. Worthmann (June 18, 1857 – April 11, 1946) and John G. Steinbach (b. 1878)

The firm is best remembered for its design of large and elaborate churches in the Chicago area which were built for Roman Catholic, Eastern Catholic, and Lutheran
clients. Worthmann and Steinbach were also active outside of Chicago and eventually built for clients in Indiana, Michigan and Wisconsin.

Works
 St. Mary of the Angels Church, Chicago, IL
 St. John Berchmans Church, Chicago, IL
 St. Nicholas Ukrainian Catholic Cathedral, Chicago, IL
 St. Joseph Shrine, Chicago, IL
 The Shrine of Our Lady of Pompeii, Chicago, IL
 The Basilica of St. Hyacinth, Chicago, IL
 St. Casimir Church (now Our Lady of Tepeyac), Chicago, IL
 Holy Innocents Church, Chicago, IL
 St Stanislaus Bishop and Martyr Church, Chicago, IL
 Nativity of the Blessed Virgin Mary Church, Chicago, IL
 Our Lady of Lourdes Church, Chicago, IL (original building later enlarged and relocated by Joseph W. McCarthy)
 St. Barbara Church, Chicago, IL
 St. James Lutheran Church, Chicago, IL
 Hollenbach Building, Chicago, IL
 Jehova Evangelical Lutheran Church, Chicago, IL
 St. Mary of Czestochowa Church, Cicero, IL
 St. Peter Church, La Porte, IN
 St. Casimir Church, South Bend, IN

References

American ecclesiastical architects
Architects of cathedrals
Architects of Roman Catholic churches
Design companies established in 1903
Design companies disestablished in 1928
Gothic Revival architects
1903 establishments in Illinois
1928 disestablishments in Illinois
Defunct architecture firms based in Chicago